Tarasa is a genus of flowering plants belonging to the family Malvaceae.

Its native range is Mexico, Peru to Chile.

Species:

Tarasa alberti 
Tarasa antofagastana 
Tarasa capitata 
Tarasa cardenasii 
Tarasa cerrateae 
Tarasa congestiflora 
Tarasa corrugata 
Tarasa geranioides 
Tarasa heterophylla 
Tarasa hornschuchiana 
Tarasa humilis 
Tarasa latearistata 
Tarasa marinii 
Tarasa martiniana 
Tarasa meyeri 
Tarasa nototrichoides 
Tarasa odonellii 
Tarasa operculata 
Tarasa pediculata 
Tarasa reichei 
Tarasa rhombifolia 
Tarasa tarapacana 
Tarasa tenella 
Tarasa tenuis 
Tarasa thyrsoidea 
Tarasa trisecta 
Tarasa umbellata 
Tarasa urbaniana

References

Malvaceae
Malvaceae genera